Hotel Charlotte may refer to:

 Hotel Charlotte (Groveland, California)
 Hotel Charlotte (Charlotte, North Carolina)